Ozark Wildcat was a wooden roller coaster at the now-defunct Celebration City amusement park in Branson, Missouri. Manufactured by Great Coasters International, it opened to the public on May 1, 2003. After only six seasons, it permanently closed on October 25, 2008, along with the rest of the park. In October 2015, Herschend Family Entertainment announced that it would be removed. It was demolished on December 15, 2015, and its trains were sent to Dollywood for the Thunderhead GCI roller coaster.

Rider Experience
Once riders were carried out of the station, they entered a slow helix turn and the train went up into the chain lift. After the lift, a short dip was followed by a steep helix turn-drop. Many bunny-hops provided plenty of "air-time" while the padded seats of the coaster still provided a smooth ride. A large, fast, helix and a sudden drop proclaimed the final act before the train rolled into the train shack, turned 90 degrees to the right, and entered the loading station. The safety restraints automatically released, and after detaching precautionary seat belts, riders were free to exit the ride.

Awards

References

External links
The Ozark Wildcat at greatcoasters.com

Former roller coasters in Missouri
Buildings and structures in Taney County, Missouri
2003 establishments in Missouri
2008 disestablishments in Missouri
Buildings and structures demolished in 2015